New Hampshire Route 77 (abbreviated NH 77) is a  nominally east-west highway in Hillsborough and Merrimack counties in southern New Hampshire. It runs from New Boston to Dunbarton. Though labeled as east-west, the road has a north-south alignment for half of its length.

The western terminus is in New Boston at New Hampshire Route 13 and New Hampshire Route 136. The eastern terminus of NH 77 is in Dunbarton at New Hampshire Route 13.

Route description 
NH 77's western terminus is at NH 13 in New Boston, just north of the town's central village, where it forks off to the north on Weare Road. Entering Weare, the road changes names to Dustin Tavern Road. At Country Three Corners, it meets the eastern terminus of NH 149 and merges with NH 114, where the name changes to South Stark Highway. Heading due north and passing by the eastern slopes of Mount Wallingford, the two routes cross through the main village of Weare at the center of town, where the road becomes North Stark Highway. and upon crossing the Piscataquog River, at a hard right turn NH 77 leaves NH 114/Stark Highway to join Concord Stage Road. Winding past Weare Town Forest and leaving near the northeast corner of the town, NH 77 enters Dunbarton near the northern end of town and reaches its eastern terminus at NH 13.

Major intersections

References

External links

 New Hampshire State Route 77 on Flickr

077
Transportation in Hillsborough County, New Hampshire
Transportation in Merrimack County, New Hampshire